David McCracken (born 16 October 1981) is a Scottish football player and coach, whose last role was as co-manager of Falkirk between 2019 and 2021. McCracken, who played as a central defender, was a Scotland under-21 internationalist, having made five appearances at that level between 2001 and 2003. McCracken started his career with Dundee United in the Scottish Premier League and was a first team player there for seven years before leaving in May 2007. He subsequently played in England for Football League clubs Wycombe Wanderers, Milton Keynes Dons and Brentford before returning to Scotland with St Johnstone in 2011. He joined Falkirk in August 2013, playing with the club for four seasons, before finishing his playing career with Peterhead.

Career

Dundee United
McCracken made his competitive senior debut in a Scottish Premier League (SPL) match against Celtic on 2 May 2000. In the 2000–01 season, he made nine appearances, mostly at full back, and scored his first goal in the opening day defeat to Celtic at Tannadice. McCracken made his debut for Scotland under-21s in a 1–0 win over Latvia. He played 22 times for the first team during season 2001–02.

The 2002–03 season saw McCracken make 30 appearances and in 2003–04 he was part of the first team for all but seven games, to bring his total appearances to 99, during which he scored three times. He was then part of the side that finished fifth in the league to give Dundee United their best finish since 1996–97.

McCracken had missed only two matches during the 2004–05 season, helping the side reach the semi-finals of the Scottish League Cup, when he was injured during a Scottish Cup tie against Queen of the South. He only managed another two games before the end of the season, but was awarded a new two-year contract in July 2005. McCracken missed just five matches in the whole of the 2005–06 season, taking his total of appearances for Dundee United to 165, as the club finished in ninth place in the SPL for a second consecutive season.

McCracken was told he was free to leave the club at the end of the 2006–07 season, making his final appearance in a last day 0–0 draw at home to Motherwell.

Wycombe Wanderers
On 13 June 2007, David McCracken joined Wycombe Wanderers on a two-year deal, playing his first English club. After the move, McCracken says joining Wycombe was good opportunities to work under manager
compatriot Paul Lambert

He was then announced as captain on 9 August 2007, and made his début two days later in the 1–0 loss at home to Accrington Stanley. In November, McCracken soon suffered an injury after tore his calf injury, that will left him on the sidelines for two weeks. He made his return for the club, on 14 December 2007, in a 2–0 win over Morecambe His first goal arrived in the 1–0 home win over Rotherham United on 16 February 2008, which was his only goal in his first season at Adams Park. Having failed to reach the League One following the play-offs, McCracken was soon devastated following Lambert resignation and left the squad let down because of this.

The next season was prove an impressive second season with the club culminated in Wycombe's promotion to Football League One, as well as McCracken being named in the PFA League Two Team of the Year for the 2008–09 season. In January, McCracken improved contract with the club was stalled, leading been the subject of transfer speculation. His second goal for the club came on the final day of the season, as part of a 1–2 home defeat to Notts County. After the season, McCracken was offered a new contract. However, McCracken turned down another deal with the club, which left him a difficult decision to turned down a new deal with Wycombe. Ahead of a match between MK Dons and Wycombe, on 22 September 2009, Manager Peter Taylor warned the club's supporter not to boo McCracken will only make the Scot more determined.

Milton Keynes Dons
On 20 June 2009 it was announced that he had signed for the Chairboys' neighbours Milton Keynes Dons on a two-year deal. On his first training with the club, McCracken says he never meet newly manager Roberto Di Matteo. He made 41 appearances, scoring one goal. In his one year at stadium:mk (under Paul Ince), he made little impact and was sold on to Brentford.

Brentford
In July 2010, McCracken signed a two-year contract with another League One side Brentford. Upon the move, McCracken says joining the club left him playing catch-up in terms of pre-season training. Like his time at Brentford, McCracken, once again, made a little impact.

After making only two starts for the club, McCracken moved to Bristol Rovers on 18 January 2011 on an initial one-month loan deal. On the last day of the transfer window, McCracken loan spell at Bristol Rovers was extended, until the end of the season. On 25 April 2011, McCracken then received a red card for a professional foul after elbowing Adam Smith in a 2–1 loss against AFC Bournemouth which he missed the entire match for the rest of the season. At the end of the season, McCracken was released by the club after his contract was terminated by mutual consent.

St Johnstone
On 23 June 2011 McCracken signed a two-year contract with St Johnstone, a few days after being released by the club. Teammate Peter Enckelman praised manager Derek McInnes for signing McCracken and Frazer Wright after losing Michael Duberry on a free transfer, where he returned to England. Having been an unused substitute in the matches or not in the starting line-up at the start of the season, McCracken soon have his playing time increased throughout the season. On 17 March 2012, McCracken scored his first goal for the club, in a 3–0 win over St Mirren.

In 2012–13 season, McCracken start his season, appearing in all of their two UEFA Europa League qualifiers against Turkish side Eskişehirspor. Soon after, McCracken soon suffered an illness from a virus. In mid-November, he fractured his cheek bone during a 1–1 draw against Celtic after clashing with Victor Wanyama. Following a further diagnosis of the injury, it announced that he would miss up to six weeks and might require surgery. After a making a return against Heart of Midlothian, He scored his first goal two days later, in the fourth of Scottish Cup, in a 3–0 win over Cowdenbeath. Later in the season, McCracken soon regained his place in the first team. At the end of the 2012–13 season, McCracken left the club after having his contract withdraw, but believes the club would have a change of heart and the main reason of his contract offer withdraw was his recurring of injuries.

Falkirk
Following his departure from St Johnstone, McCracken joined Falkirk on a one-year contract. After a brief struggle with an injury at the beginning of the season, McCracken quickly established himself in the Falkirk side. Following a successful season, on 1 May 2014, he agreed a new one-year contract with The Bairns, running until 2015. McCracken was released by Falkirk in May 2017.

Peterhead 
On 2 July 2017, McCracken signed for Peterhead.

Coaching career
During his time with Peterhead, McCracken took on coaching responsibilities.

He left Peterhead in November 2019 to take a coaching position at Falkirk, working with Lee Miller. After a few games in interim charge of the team, McCracken and Miller were given control until the end of the 2019–20 season. McCracken and Miller were sacked by Falkirk in April 2021.

Career statistics

Club

Managerial record

initially caretaker. Made permanent on 13 December 2019.
 statistics includes the 3-0 forfeit win over Kilmarnock in the Scottish League Cup on Tuesday 6 October 2020.

Honours
Dundee United
Scottish Cup runner-up (1): 2004–05

Falkirk
Scottish Cup runner-up (1): 2014–15

Individual
PFA Team of the Year: 2008–09 Football League Two

References

External links

1981 births
Footballers from Glasgow
Living people
Association football defenders
Scottish footballers
Scotland under-21 international footballers
Dundee United F.C. players
Wycombe Wanderers F.C. players
Milton Keynes Dons F.C. players
Brentford F.C. players
Bristol Rovers F.C. players
St Johnstone F.C. players
Scottish Premier League players
English Football League players
Falkirk F.C. players
Scottish Professional Football League players
Peterhead F.C. players
Falkirk F.C. non-playing staff
Scottish football managers
Scottish Professional Football League managers
Falkirk F.C. managers